is an opera in three acts, Op. 412, by Darius Milhaud to a libretto by Madeleine Milhaud after the 1792 play, the third in Beaumarchais’ Figaro trilogy.  It premiered at the Grand Théâtre de Genève on 13 June 1966.

Roles

References

Palmer, Christopher (1992), 'Mère coupable, La' in The New Grove Dictionary of Opera, ed. Stanley Sadie (London) 

Operas by Darius Milhaud
French-language operas
Operas
1966 operas
Operas based on plays
Operas based on works by Pierre Beaumarchais